Janez Vrhovec (19 January 1921 – 7 October 1997) was a  Yugoslav  actor of  Slovenian-German origin.  Vrhovec appeared in a number of Yugoslav and Serbian films, as well as many international productions, in a career spanning almost five decades.

Selected filmography
Austerlitz (1959)
Perfidy (Nevjera, 1953)
The Last Bridge (Die Letzte Brücke, 1954)
The Fourteenth Day (Dan četrnaesti, 1960)
Atomic War Bride (Rat, 1960)
Enclosure (L'Enclos, 1961)
 The Triumph of Robin Hood (1962)
Prometheus of the Island (Prometej s otoka Viševice, 1964)
 Freddy in the Wild West (1964)
 The Shoot (1964)
 Man Is Not a Bird (1965)
Eneide (1971)
I Even Met Happy Gypsies (Skupljači perja, 1967)
Gates to Paradise (1968)
Beach Guard in Winter (Čuvar plaže u zimskom periodu, 1976)
The Falcon (Banović Strahinja, 1983)
The Secret Diary of Sigmund Freud (1984)
 Der Sonne entgegen (1985, TV series)

External links

1921 births
1997 deaths
Male actors from Belgrade
Yugoslav male actors